Plate-like osteoma cutis is a congenital condition characterized by firm papules and nodules on the skin.

See also 
 List of cutaneous conditions
 List of genes mutated in cutaneous conditions

References 

 
 

Genodermatoses